Severe Tropical Cyclone Marcus was a very powerful tropical cyclone that struck Australia's Northern Territory and the Kimberley region of Western Australia in March 2018. It was the strongest tropical cyclone of the 2017–18 Australian region cyclone season, as well as the strongest tropical cyclone in the Australian region basin since George in 2007. It was also considered the worst cyclone to hit Darwin since Tracy in 1974. It was also the strongest tropical cyclone since Tracy to hit Darwin, making landfall there as a Category 2 tropical cyclone. Marcus formed on March 14 from a tropical low situated over the northeast Timor Sea, which quickly moved southeast and strengthened into a tropical cyclone the next day.

Meteorological history

On 15 March 2018, a tropical low formed in the western Arafura Sea. Drifting east-southeastwards north of the Tiwi Islands, the tropical low strengthened into a Category 1 tropical cyclone on the Australian scale early on 16 March, and was accordingly given the name Marcus. In a generally favourable environment for intensification, Cyclone Marcus reached Category 2 status in the hours before it crossed the Northern Territory coastline, on 17 March. On 16 March, Marcus moved down towards the Australian coast, and rapidly intensified before making landfall in Darwin as a weak Category 2 tropical cyclone.

Marcus intensified markedly upon moving away from the coast. Soon, the storm started to rapidly intensify, and by 21 March, Marcus reached Category 5 tropical cyclone intensity. However, after doing so, the storm began to rapidly weaken due to a combination of an eyewall replacement cycle, stronger wind shear, and cooler waters. Marcus continued to rapidly weaken as it moved southward. The system soon transitioned into an extratropical cyclone on March 25, though Marcus' remnant would continue moving southeastward for another couple of days. On March 27, the extratropical remnant of Marcus dissipated off the southwest coast of Australia.

Preparation and impact 

Before the storm, on 15 March, the Australian Bureau of Meteorology (BoM) issued cyclone warnings for Darwin, the Tiwi Islands, and parts of the northwest Top End. Major events and flights in and out of Darwin were cancelled. Approximately 26,000 homes were affected by electricity outages as a result of the destructive winds, even in areas as far south as Batchelor and Adelaide River. Thousands of trees were destroyed across the Greater Darwin region including many African mahoganies planted after Cyclone Tracy for their fast growing and expansive shade qualities.

Public schools and non-essential public service agencies were closed while the clean-up efforts continued and tree trunks removed from roads. Cyclone Marcus was the most destructive storm to hit Darwin since Cyclone Tracy caused devastation on Christmas Eve of 1974. The insurance loss were over A$85 million (US$65.6 million). In all, Marcus caused an estimated total of A$97.46 million (US$75 million) in damages.

The cleanup response was coordinated by the Northern Territory Emergency Services and included soldiers from the 5th Battalion and the 1st Combat Engineer Regiment of the Australian Army. The US Marine Rotational Force – Darwin (MRF-D) also contributed to the cleanup effort.

Retirement
Due to the damage caused by the cyclone in Darwin and its subsequent intensification, the name Marcus was retired and was replaced with Marco.

See also

Weather of 2017 and 2018
Tropical cyclones in 2017 and 2018
1897 Darwin cyclone – a cyclone that also caused severe damage in Darwin
Similarly intense tropical cyclones in the Australian Region:
Cyclone Inigo (2003)
Cyclone Gwenda (1999)
Cyclone Orson (1989)

References

External links
 Australian Bureau of Meteorology

Category 5 Australian region cyclones
Tropical cyclones in the Northern Territory
2017–18 Australian region cyclone season
2018 natural disasters
Disasters in the Northern Territory
2010s in the Northern Territory
Marcus
Tropical cyclones in Western Australia